Harald Vasbotten (9 November 1893 – 15 March 1973) was a Norwegian sport wrestler.

He was born in Lenvik and represented the club Fagforeningens IL. He competed in Greco-Roman wrestling at the 1920 Summer Olympics, in the heavyweight class. He was awarded the King's Cup at the national championships in 1917.

References

External links
 

1893 births
1973 deaths
People from Lenvik
Olympic wrestlers of Norway
Wrestlers at the 1920 Summer Olympics
Norwegian male sport wrestlers
Sportspeople from Troms og Finnmark